The year 2008 in architecture involved some significant architectural events and new buildings.

Events
February 10–11 – 2008 Namdaemun fire: The wooden superstructure of the 550-year-old Namdaemun gate in Seoul (South Korea) is destroyed by arson.
June 20 – The Architects (Recognition of European Qualifications etc and Saving and Transitional Provision) Regulations 2008 comes into force in the UK.
July 8 – The first in Francesco da Mosto's television series Francesco's Mediterranean Voyage is broadcast.
October 2 – The William L. Slayton House, designed by I. M. Pei in 1958, is listed in the United States National Register of Historic Places.
October – The inaugural World Architecture Festival is held in Barcelona.

Buildings and structures

Buildings opened
January 1 – China Central Television Headquarters building in Beijing, by Rem Koolhaas and OMA, officially opens.
January 12 – New Amundsen–Scott South Pole Station officially inaugurated.
January – Fuglsang Art Museum in Lolland, Denmark, designed by Tony Fretton, inaugurated.
March 26 – Terminal 3 of the Beijing Capital International Airport opens, designed by Foster + Partners.
March 27 – Heathrow Terminal 5, designed by the Richard Rogers Partnership, opens.
April 12 – New National Opera House in Oslo opens.
April – Maggie's Centre in London, a drop-in cancer care centre designed by Rogers Stirk Harbour + Partners, opens (Stirling Prize 2009).
June – Contemporary Jewish Museum in San Francisco, designed by Daniel Libeskind, opened.
June 25 – Chords Bridge ("Bridge of Strings") in Jerusalem, designed by Santiago Calatrava, inaugurated.
June 28 – Beijing National Stadium designed by Herzog & de Meuron (known as the "Bird's Nest"), opened for the 2008 Summer Olympics.
August 1 – Beijing South railway station, designed by Terry Farrell, opened.
September
A. P. Møller School, Schleswig, Germany, designed by C. F. Møller Architects.
Darwin Centre II, Natural History Museum, London, designed by C. F. Møller Architects.
September 11 – Ponte della Costituzione in Venice, designed by Santiago Calatrava, inaugurated.
September 24 – Atlantis The Palm in Dubai, United Arab Emirates.
September 27 – California Academy of Sciences in Golden Gate Park, San Francisco, designed by Renzo Piano.
October 16 – Weill Hall, Cornell University, designed by Richard Meier
November – New Ahus, Akershus University Hospital, Oslo, Norway, designed by C. F. Møller Architects, opened.
November 11 – Curve (theatre) in Leicester, England, designed by Rafael Viñoly, is opened.
November 20 – Peter B. Lewis Library at Princeton University, by Frank Gehry, officially dedicated.
November 22 – Museum of Islamic Art, Doha, in Qatar, designed by I. M. Pei, is officially opened.
The Public, West Bromwich, England, designed by Will Alsop, opens first stages to public.

Buildings completed

January 28 – Beijing National Aquatics Center, known as the "Water Cube", in readiness for the 2008 Summer Olympics.
August 28 – Shanghai World Financial Center in Pudong, Shanghai, China, designed by William Pedersen.
November – Transformation AGO (Art Gallery of Ontario) renovation by Frank Gehry.
December – Assut de l'Or Bridge in Valencia, Spain, designed by Santiago Calatrava.
date unknown
Remodelling of Lumen United Reformed Church in Bloomsbury, London, designed by Theis + Khan Architects.
Mountain Dwellings, Copenhagen, Denmark, designed by Bjarke Ingels.
Linked Hybrid, a nine-tower high-rise housing project by Steven Holl Architects, in Beijing, China.
459 West 18th Street, Manhattan, a high-rise condominium designed by Della Valle + Bernheimer.
Living Shangri-La in Vancouver, Canada
Torre Caja Madrid (Caja Madrid Tower), Spain, designed by Foster and Partners.
First Kranhaus in Rheinauhafen, Cologne, Germany, designed by Alfons Linster and Hadi Teherani of BRT Architekten.
Westside shopping and leisure complex, Bern, Switzerland, designed by Daniel Libeskind.
Olnik Spanu House, Garrison, New York, United States, designed by Alberto Campo Baeza.
Library and Learning Center of the University of Vienna, by Zaha Hadid 
Moliner House, Zaragoza, Spain, designed by Alberto Campo Baeza.

Awards
American Academy of Arts and Letters Gold Medal – Richard Meier
AIA Gold Medal – Renzo Piano (Italy).
Architecture Firm Award – KieranTimberlake Associates.
Driehaus Architecture Prize – Andrés Duany and Elizabeth Plater-Zyberk.
Emporis Skyscraper Award – Mode Gakuen Cocoon Tower in Shinjuku, Tokyo.
Grand Prix de l'urbanisme – David Mangin.
Lawrence Israel Prize – AvroKO
LEAF Award, Grand Prix – schmidt hammer lassen for Performers House
Praemium Imperiale Architecture Award – Peter Zumthor.
Pritzker Prize – Jean Nouvel.
Rome Prize for architecture – Frederick B. Fisher
RAIA Gold Medal – Richard Johnson.
RIBA Royal Gold Medal – Edward Cullinan.
Stirling Prize – Feilden Clegg Bradley Studios & Alison Brooks Architects & Maccreanor Lavington.
Thomas Jefferson Medal in Architecture – Gro Harlem Brundtland.
Twenty-five Year Award – The Atheneum.
UIA Gold Medal – Teodoro Gonzalez de Leon.
Vincent Scully Prize – Robert A. M. Stern.

Births

Deaths

January 1 – Harald Deilmann, German architect (born 1920)
January 30 – Fernando Higueras, Spanish architect (born 1930)
February 9 – Carm Lino Spiteri, Maltese architect and politician (born 1932)
March 5 – Nader Khalili, Iranian architect, writer, and humanitarian (born 1936)
March 24 – Victor Christ-Janer, American modernist architect (born 1915)
March 29 – Ralph Rapson, American architect (born 1914)
March 31 – David Todd, American architect (born 1915)
May 30 – Rodney Gordon, English architect (born 1933)
June 15 – Walter Netsch, American architect (born 1920)
July 6 – George Tibbits, Australian composer and architect (born 1933)
September 18 – Abdur Rahman Hye, Pakistani architect (born 1919)
November 14 – Sir Bernard Feilden, English conservation architect (born 1919)
November 29 – Jørn Utzon, Danish architect (born 1918)

See also
Timeline of architecture

References

 
21st-century architecture